Yabog Airport  is an airstrip near Las Juntas in the Santa Cruz Department of Bolivia.

Google Historical Imagery (June 2007) shows a  grass runway.

See also

Transport in Bolivia
List of airports in Bolivia

References

External links 
 Airport record for Yabog Airport at Landings.com
OpenStreetMap - Yabog Airport

Airports in Santa Cruz Department (Bolivia)